The Gods Must Be Crazy is a 1980 comedy film written, produced, edited and directed by Jamie Uys. An international co-production of South Africa and Botswana, it is the first film in The Gods Must Be Crazy series. Set in Southern Africa, the film stars Namibian San farmer Nǃxau ǂToma as Xi, a hunter-gatherer of the Kalahari Desert whose tribe discovers a glass Coca-Cola bottle dropped from an airplane, and believe it to be a gift from their gods. When Xi sets out to return the bottle to the gods, his journey becomes intertwined with that of a biologist (Marius Weyers), a newly hired village school teacher (Sandra Prinsloo), and a band of guerrilla terrorists.

The Gods Must Be Crazy was released in South Africa on 10 September 1980 by Ster-Kinekor, and broke several box office records in the country, becoming the most financially successful South African film ever produced at the time. The film was a commercial and critical success in most other countries, but took longer to find success in the United States, where it was eventually re-released in 1984 by 20th Century Fox, with its original Afrikaans dialogue being dubbed into English. Despite its success, the film attracted criticism for its depiction of race and perceived ignorance of discrimination and apartheid in South Africa.In 1989, it was followed by the sequel The Gods Must Be Crazy II.

Plot
Xi and his San tribe live happily in the Kalahari Desert, away from industrial civilization. One day, a glass Coca-Cola bottle is thrown out of an airplane by a pilot and falls to the ground unbroken. Initially, Xi's people assume the bottle to be a gift from their gods, just as they believe plants and animals are, and find many uses for it. Unlike other gifts, however, there is only one glass bottle, which causes unforeseen conflict within the tribe. As a result, Xi, wearing only a loincloth, decides to make a pilgrimage to the edge of the world and dispose of the divisive object.

Along the way, Xi encounters biologist Andrew Steyn, who is studying the manure of wildlife; Steyn's assistant and mechanic, M'pudi; Kate Thompson, a woman who quit her job as a journalist in Johannesburg to become a village school teacher; and eventually a band of guerrillas led by Sam Boga, who are being pursued by government troops after a failed assassination attempt. In a fictitious town called Biryani, northwest of Botswana, Boga's men kill three cabinet members and injure two others in an attempt on the president's life, sending the military in hot pursuit.

Steyn is tasked with bringing Thompson to the village where she will teach, but he is awkward and clumsy around her. Their Land Rover stalls while trying to ford a deep river; he hoists it out with a winch, but it continues lifting the vehicle to a very high treetop level while a forgetful Steyn is distracted extricating Thompson from a briar bush.  She more than once mistakes his attempts to evade wild animals, and putting out an evening campfire, as advances towards her. Eventually, a snobbish safari tour guide named Jack Hind arrives, and takes Thompson the rest of the way to the village.

One day, Xi happens upon a herd of goats, and shoots one with a tranquilizer arrow, planning to eat it. He is arrested and sentenced to jail. M'pudi, who once lived with the San and can speak the San language, is discontent with the verdict. He and Steyn arrange to hire Xi as a tracker for the remainder of his sentence in lieu of prison time, and teach Xi how to drive Steyn's Land Rover. Meanwhile, the guerrillas invade Thompson's school, taking her and the students as hostages as they make their escape to a neighbouring country.

Steyn, M'pudi and Xi, immersed in their fieldwork, find that they are along the terrorists' and children's path, and observe their movements with a telescope. They manage to immobilize six of the eight guerrillas using makeshift tranquilizer darts launched by Xi with a miniature bow, allowing Thompson and the children to confiscate the guerillas' firearms. Steyn and M'pudi apprehend the remaining two guerrillas by frightening one with a snake and by shooting at a tree above the other, causing latex to drip from the tree and irritate his skin. Jack Hind arrives and takes Thompson and the children away, taking credit for the rescue that Steyn, M'pudi and Xi had actually planned and executed.

Later, with Xi's term over, Steyn pays his wages and sends him on his way. Xi has never seen paper money (banknotes) before, and throws them on the ground. Steyn and M'pudi then drive from their camp to visit Thompson, where Steyn attempts to explain his tendency to be uncoordinated in her presence, but accidentally and repeatedly knocks over a number of objects in the process. Thompson finds his efforts endearing, and kisses Steyn.

Xi eventually arrives at God's Window, the top of a cliff with a solid layer of low-lying clouds obscuring the landscape below. Convinced that he has reached the edge of the world, he throws the bottle off the cliff, and returns to his family.

Cast

Director Jamie Uys appears in an uncredited role as the Reverend.

Production

Development and casting

Jamie Uys conceived the premise of The Gods Must Be Crazy while making the 1974 documentary Animals Are Beautiful People. The documentary was filmed partially on the Kalahari Desert, where Uys first encountered the San people and "fell in love with them". Uys chose a Coca-Cola bottle as the object that the San people would discover and covet in The Gods Must Be Crazy because he felt that the bottle was representative of "our plastic society", and because it "is a beautiful thing, if you've never seen glass before".

Uys noted that he modelled the character of Andrew Steyn after himself: "I used to be awkward like that, especially with women. But then, I think most young guys knock things over with their first girl".

After writing the script for The Gods Must Be Crazy, Uys reportedly spent three months traversing the Kalahari Desert with an interpreter, searching for a San person to play the role of Xi in the film. Visiting areas of the desert inhabited by the San, Uys took photographs of individuals he felt he might cast, and then "marked the longitude and latitude, so we could find them again".

Uys decided to cast Namibian San farmer Nǃxau ǂToma as Xi, and later recalled that "At first [Nǃxau] didn't understand, because they have no word for work. Then the interpreter asked, 'Would you like to come with us for some days?" N!xau agreed and flew with Uys by airplane to Windhoek, Namibia, which served as a base for the film's production. Uys stated that "the airplane didn't impress him at all. He thinks we are magicians, so he believes we can do anything. Nothing impressed him". In his hotel room, N!xau agreed to use the toilet, but slept on the floor rather than on the provided bed.

However, according to author Josef Gugler, Uys "[fictionalized] the production of the film. The stories he told reviewers varied". Unlike what was presented in The Gods Must Be Crazy, N!xau did not lead a hunter-gatherer lifestyle; he grew up as a herder on a farm in Botswana, before moving to Namibia to work as a cook. In the 1980 documentary film Nǃai, the Story of a ǃKung Woman, directed by John Marshall, footage of the filming of The Gods Must Be Crazy is used. The documentary shows San restricted to living in a reservation established by South African authorities in Tsumkwe, Namibia. The San there are shown to not be hunter-gatherers; they are instead dependent on the government for food and other aid, with some suffering from tuberculosis.

Filming
The Gods Must Be Crazy was shot in Tsumkwe, Namibia, as well as in Botswana.

According to Uys, N!xau would be flown back to his home in the Kalahari Desert every three or four weeks to prevent him from suffering from culture shock. During his time in urban areas, N!xau learned to smoke and acquired an affinity for liquor and sake. Uys said that he paid N!xau $300 for his first 10 days of work, but that the money was reportedly blown away by wind. N!xau was then compensated with 12 head of cattle. In 1985, Uys said that he had sent N!xau $100 a month since filming, which N!xau used at a trading store 60 miles from his hunting ground; Uys also stated that a $20,000 trust account in N!xau's name had been established.

A scene in which a rhinoceros stomps out a fire is based in a Burmese legend about fire-eating rhinos, which is not widely known in Africa and appears not to be based in fact.

Release

Box office
The Gods Must Be Crazy was initially released in South Africa on 10 September 1980 by Ster-Kinekor Pictures.Within its first four days of its release, the film broke box office records in every city in South Africa. It became the highest-grossing film of 1982 in Japan, where it was released under the title Bushman. Executive producer Boet Troskie sold the distribution rights to the film to 45 countries.

For its release in the United States, the original Afrikaans dialogue was dubbed into English, and voiceover work was provided for !Kung and Tswana lines. The film initially received a limited American release through Jensen Farley Pictures in 1982, but performed poorly in at least half a dozen test cities. However, the film would eventually find critical and commercial success when it was re-released by 20th Century Fox on 9 July 1984, becoming the highest-grossing foreign film released in the United States at the time. The film also played at the Music Hall Theater in Beverly Hills, California for at least eight months.

Within its first four years of release, The Gods Must Be Crazy had grossed  worldwide.

Critical reception
On the review aggregator website Rotten Tomatoes, The Gods Must Be Crazy has an approval rating of 85% based on 26 reviews, with an average rating of 7.4/10. On Metacritic, which uses a weighted average, the film has a score of 73 out of 100 based on six reviews, indicating "generally favourable reviews".

Roger Ebert of the Chicago Sun-Times gave the film three stars out of four, concluding that "it might be easy to make a farce about screwball happenings in the desert, but it's a lot harder to create a funny interaction between nature and human nature. This movie's a nice little treasure". Variety stated that the film's "main virtues are its striking, widescreen visuals of unusual locations, and the sheer educational value of its narration".

In his review of the film for The New York Times, critic Vincent Canby wrote that "watching Jamie Uys's Gods Must Be Crazy, [...] one might suspect that there were no such things as apartheid or the Immorality Act or even South Africa". Though he called the film "often genuinely, nonpolitically funny", he noted that "there's also something disturbing about the film", in that "we tend to feel that any South African work that doesn't actively condemn apartheid has the secondary effect of condoning it, if only through silence".

Home media
In mid-November 1986, The Gods Must Be Crazy was released on VHS in the U.S. by CBS/Fox on its Playhouse Video label.

In 2004, The Gods Must Be Crazy was released on DVD by Sony Pictures Entertainment. It was also released on DVD as a double feature with The Gods Must Be Crazy II.

Controversies
The Gods Must Be Crazy attracted criticism for its perceived perpetuation of racial stereotypes and ignorance of discrimination and apartheid in South Africa. In the U.S., the film was reportedly picketed by the National Conference of Black Lawyers and other anti-apartheid groups when it screened at the 68th Street Playhouse in New York City.

Accusations of patronization
Both New York Times critic Vincent Canby and author Josef Gugler called the film "patronizing" towards the San people. Canby wrote that the San in the film "are seen to be frightfully quaint if not downright cute", and compared the film's narrator's statement that the San "must be the most contented people in the world" to "exactly the sort of thing that Mussolini might have said when he got those trains running on time". Gugler considered both the film's narrator and the character of Mpudi condescending, writing that "even if Mpudi feels for the San people, he is just as patronizing as the narrator: 'They are the sweetest little buggers'". In response to accusations of patronization, Uys said that "I don't think the film is patronizing. When the Bushman is with us in the city, I do patronize him, because he's stupid. But in the desert, he patronizes me, because I'm stupid and he's brilliant".

Criticisms related to apartheid
In 1985, cultural anthropologist Toby Alice Volkman wrote that money was "a pressing concern" for the San when The Gods Must Be Crazy was filmed, with many of them dependent on government aid and purchased food; she noted that many San enlisted in the South African Army due to the high wages it paid. She wrote: "Because the myth of Bushman innocence and bliss underlies the popularity of The Gods Must Be Crazy, it is no surprise that Mr. Uys would like us to believe in it. There is, however, little to laugh about in Bushmanland: 1,000 demoralized, formerly independent foragers crowd into a squalid, tubercular homeland, getting by on handouts of cornmeal and sugar, drinking Johnny Walker or home brew, fighting with one another and joining the South African Army".

The following year, Canadian anthropologist Richard Borshay Lee called the film "an amusing but thinly disguised piece of South African propaganda in which a peculiar element of South African white mythology receives prominent attention". Lee wrote that "the notion that some San in the 1980s remain untouched by 'civilization' is a cruel joke. The San have been the subject of a century of rapid social change and especially in the last twenty years have been forced to endure all the 'benefits' of South Africa's apartheid policies in Namibia".

Gugler wrote that the guerrillas in the film are depicted as "bad Africans [...] dangerous and destructive all right, but they are also indolent and inept. In the end, even Kate Thompson gets to disarm one of them. Their leader, Sam Boga, articulates what the film is showing us about African guerrillas: 'Why do I have to work with amateurs?' He, in turn, serves to confirm the apartheid credo that Africans would be happy with the White dispensation were it not for foreigners fomenting discontent and making trouble". Gugler goes on to state that Uys "[perpetuates] the myths of apartheid: an ordered world with Whites on top, a world where Africans are content but for the interference of outsiders".

When asked about his thoughts on apartheid, Uys commented that "I think it's a mess. We've done some silly, naughty things that we're ashamed of. We're trying to dismantle it, but it's a very complicated thing. If you go too slow, it's bad, and if you go too fast, it will ruin the economy and everyone will starve. I hope I'm not a racist, but everybody likes to think of himself as not racist, and I don't think that any of us can swear we're not racist. If it means you hate the coloured man, I'm not racist. If it means you choose to marry a girl of your own colour, is that racist, too? If the two are in love, it doesn't matter. But I chose a white girl as my wife".

Sequel and related films

The Gods Must Be Crazy was followed by one official sequel, The Gods Must Be Crazy II, released by Columbia Pictures in 1989. The Gods Must Be Crazy II was also written and directed and Uys, and again stars N!xau. This was followed by an unofficial sequel, Crazy Safari (also titled The Gods Must Be Crazy III), a Hong Kong film starring N!xau. Other unofficial sequels include Crazy Hong Kong (The Gods Must Be Crazy IV) and The Gods Must Be Funny in China (The Gods Must Be Crazy V). Two other unrelated films, Jewel of the Gods and There's a Zulu On My Stoep, were marketed in some territories as sequels to The Gods Must Be Crazy.

Legacy
Irish Spring soap had a 1989 commercial parodying the film.

The video for the song "Take Me to Your Leader" by American rock band Incubus pays homage to the film.

Notes

References

Bibliography

Further reading

External links

 
 
 
 
 

1980s adventure comedy films
1980 films
1980 comedy films
20th Century Fox films
Afrikaans-language films
Coca-Cola in popular culture
English-language South African films
Films about hunter-gatherers
Films about terrorism in Africa
Films directed by Jamie Uys
Films set in Botswana
Films set in deserts
Films set in South Africa
Films shot in Botswana
Films shot in South Africa
Kalahari Desert
South African adventure comedy films
South African comedy films